Sclerotic rings are rings of bone found in the eyes of many animals in several groups of vertebrates, except for mammals and crocodilians. They can be made up of single bones or multiple segments and take their name from the sclera. They are believed to have a role in supporting the eye, especially in animals whose eyes are not spherical, or which live underwater. Fossil sclerotic rings are known for a variety of extinct animals, including ichthyosaurs, pterosaurs, and dinosaurs, but are often not preserved.

Gallery

References

Vertebrate anatomy
Dinosaur anatomy
Eye
Skull